Southampton Township is the name of some places in the U.S. state of Pennsylvania:

Southampton Township, Bedford County, Pennsylvania
Southampton Township, Cumberland County, Pennsylvania
Southampton Township, Franklin County, Pennsylvania
Southampton Township, Somerset County, Pennsylvania

See also 
 Southampton, Pennsylvania, an unincorporated community in southeastern Bucks County
 Southampton (disambiguation)
 Lower Southampton Township, Bucks County, Pennsylvania
 Upper Southampton Township, Bucks County, Pennsylvania

Pennsylvania township disambiguation pages